Napier is an unincorporated community in Braxton County, West Virginia, United States, founded in 1894, with the ZIP code of 26631.  Napier has two significant historical landmarks: the Cunningham House and Outbuildings and the Union Civil War Fortification, and both are listed on the National Register of Historic Places.

References

Unincorporated communities in Braxton County, West Virginia
Unincorporated communities in West Virginia
1894 establishments in West Virginia